Hermann Carl Albert Gutzmann, Sr. (29 January 1865 – 4 November 1922) was a German physician. He is considered the founder of phoniatrics as a medical discipline.

Early life and education
Hermann Gutzmann was born into a Jewish family in Bütow, Pomerania, in 1865. His father, was a prominent teacher for the deaf and dumb.

He received the degree of Doctor of Medicine from the University of Berlin in 1887, with the dissertation Über das Stottern ("On Stuttering").

Career
From 1889 Gutzmann practised as a specialist in diseases of the vocal organs, and, together with his father, he founded in 1890 the journal Medizinisch-pädagogische Monatsschrift für die gesamte Sprachheilkunde. In 1891 he established an outpatient clinic for the speech-impaired in Berlin, which was moved to the Medizinische Poliklinik in 1907 and affiliated with the Charité Hospital in 1912. From 1896 Gutzmann also directed a private clinic and sanatorium for the speech-impaired in Zehlendorf. He completed his habilitation in 1905 on the basis of his work Über die Atmungsstörungen beim Stottern ("On Respiratory Disorders and Stuttering"). In his , he outlined the close relationship of speech therapy to other areas of medical practice.

During World War I, Gutzmann ran a treatment centre for traumatized soldiers who had developed speech and voice disorders.

Gutzmann published 13 books and over 300 scientific papers in his lifetime. He was a member of the Prussian State Health Council, an honorary member of the Austrian Society for Experimental Phonetics, secretary of the Berlin Laryngological Society, and a member of various learned societies.

He died of sepsis in November 1922 after suffering a stab wound from a gramophone needle.

Selected bibliography
 
 
 
  With Theodor Simon Flatau.
 
 
 
 
 
  Translated by M. Ménier.

References

External links
 

1865 births
1922 deaths
19th-century German Jews
19th-century German physicians
20th-century German Jews
20th-century German physicians
Deaths from sepsis
German medical writers
German pathologists
Humboldt University of Berlin alumni
Jewish German scientists
Jewish physicians
People from Bytów County
Physicians of the Charité
Scientists from Berlin
Speech and language pathologists